Camptopteromyia is a genus of flies in the family Stratiomyidae.

Species
Camptopteromyia flaviantenna Yang, Zhang & Li, 2014
Camptopteromyia flavipes James, 1962
Camptopteromyia flavitarsa Yang, Zhang & Li, 2014
Camptopteromyia fractipennis Meijere, 1914
Camptopteromyia lanata James, 1962
Camptopteromyia nigriflagella Yang, Zhang & Li, 2014
Camptopteromyia obscura James, 1962
Camptopteromyia tibialis James, 1962

References

Stratiomyidae
Brachycera genera
Taxa named by Johannes C. H. de Meijere
Diptera of Asia